The Bertschy House is a historic house located at 507 NW Fifth Street in Bentonville, Arkansas, US.

Description and history 
It was a -story, stone and masonry house notable for its wide overhanging roof with exposed rafter tails, and a gabled portico supported by tapered square columns mounted on stone piers. Built in about 1925, it is significant as a well-preserved local example of the bungalow style, executed in local fieldstone.

The house was listed on the National Register of Historic Places on January 28, 1988.

See also
National Register of Historic Places listings in Benton County, Arkansas

References

Houses on the National Register of Historic Places in Arkansas
Houses completed in 1925
Houses in Bentonville, Arkansas
National Register of Historic Places in Bentonville, Arkansas
Bungalow architecture in Arkansas
American Craftsman architecture in Arkansas
1925 establishments in Arkansas